Alaba international market is an electronics market located in Ojo, Lagos State, Nigeria. It is the largest electronics market in Nigeria. Apart from the sales of electronic products, the market also deals in the repair of home appliances.
The market and its wide range of business activities gives opportunities to electronics and electrical engineers who specialized in the repair of faulty home appliances to transact businesses with dealers electronics.
The market is opened on a daily basis except on Sundays and public holidays.
This daily business transactions and popularity has attracted new investors and electronics dealers across Africa thereby expanding the market size and population with significant effects on the economy of Lagos State.

Basic structural characteristics

Alaba international market is a Perfect market in which  no dealer influences the price of the electronic product it buys or sells within the market with no Barriers to entry and exit.
The market is characterized by huge numbers of sellers and buyers with willingness to buy the products at a certain price based on their need and income, enhancing long term adjustments to changing in the market conditions.

See also
 List of markets in Lagos

References

Retail markets in Lagos